Rabbit Fire is a 1951 Looney Tunes cartoon starring Bugs Bunny, Daffy Duck, and Elmer Fudd. Directed by Chuck Jones and written by Michael Maltese, the cartoon is the first in Jones' "hunting trilogy"—the other two cartoons following it being Rabbit Seasoning and Duck! Rabbit, Duck! It is also the first cartoon to feature a feud between Bugs and Daffy. Produced by Edward Selzer for Warner Bros. Cartoons, Inc., the short was released to theaters on May 19, 1951 by Warner Bros. Pictures and is often considered among Jones' best and most important films.

The film marks a significant shift in Daffy's personality, going from being the insane "screwball" character who (like Bugs) overwhelmed his adversaries, to be a much more flawed individual, full of greed and vanity and desiring for attention under the spotlight. This personality change, which was previously explored by Jones in You Were Never Duckier and Daffy Dilly, and even earlier in Friz Freleng's You Ought to Be in Pictures, was done in order for Daffy to better serve as Bugs' foil. This was fueled by Bugs' popularity surpassing Daffy's quickly over the years, increasing the desire of the studio's animators to pair the two together. 

However, Daffy was returned to his original screwball personality in Who Framed Roger Rabbit, Looney Tunes: Back in Action (in which he got both personalities), Daffy's Rhapsody, New Looney Tunes, Looney Tunes Cartoons, and Bugs Bunny Builders (in which displays both personalities).

Plot
Daffy Duck lures Elmer Fudd to Bugs Bunny's burrow with fake rabbit footprints, calls down to the rabbit that a "friend" is here to see him, then watches from behind a tree as Elmer shoots at the emerged Bugs, parting his ears. As Elmer prepares to shoot again, Bugs informs him that it is not rabbit season, but rather duck season. Daffy emerges from his hiding spot, furious, and attempts to convince Elmer that Bugs is lying. Their conversation breaks down into Bugs engaging Daffy in a verbal sparring match, which results in Daffy saying it is duck season. Once he says this, he tells Elmer to fire, which he does. After Daffy's beak spins back into place, he tries the verbal game again, this time starting first. It ends the same way. When Daffy is shot for the third time, he walks away, his head now upside down. Elmer goes to shoot him, but it appears the gun is out of bullets. Bugs relays this apparent fact to Daffy and, thrilled, Daffy comes back. He grabs Elmer's gun to make sure, only to be shot with the last bullet.

Daffy then sees a sign that Bugs has nailed to a tree saying, "Duck Season Open.” As he sees Elmer approaching, he disguises himself as Bugs and reminds him that it is duck season. Bugs then appears, disguised as Daffy, complete with webbed feet and fake bill, and asks Daffy why he thinks it is duck season. Daffy points at the tree; however, Bugs has switched the sign to "Rabbit Season Open.” Elmer, of course, shoots Daffy. After Daffy gets blasted, the two shed their costumes as Daffy comments to Bugs how despicable he is. Ignoring Daffy, Bugs then begins to read duck recipes from a cookbook that he pulls from his rabbit hole, and Daffy does the same with a rabbit recipe cookbook that he also pulls from the hole.  Elmer tells them that he is a vegetarian and only hunts for the sport of it (although, in previous appearances, it has been stated that he was hunting Bugs for rabbit stew). Disgusted, Bugs gets in Elmer's face and claims there are other sports besides hunting. When Daffy then offers to play tennis, Elmer blasts him again, tells Bugs that he is next, and then begins shooting and chases both of them all the way to the rabbit hole, into which both Daffy and Bugs jump. Bugs come out to accuse Elmer of hunting rabbits with an elephant gun, suggesting that Elmer shoot an elephant instead. Just as Elmer considers it, a huge elephant appears from behind him, threatens him in a Joe Besser voice ("You do and I'll give ya such a pinch!"), and preemptively pounds him into the ground before striding off.

Elmer finally loses patience and vows to take out both that screwy rabbit and that screwball duck. Daffy comes into the scene, disguised as a hunting dog and Bugs comes in as a lady hunter. Elmer is smitten by "lady" Bugs until "dog" Daffy bites Elmer on the ankle, causing him to scream. Elmer then recognizes both of them after one of Bugs' ears pops out from under his disguise and decides to finally finish them both off. Daffy and Bugs dash to a tree, where they begin alternately tearing off an endless row of "Rabbit Season" and "Duck Season" signs until they hit a final one proclaiming it to be "Elmer Season.” They both then turn to Elmer with devious grins on their faces. The tables have now turned, Elmer gets a taste of his own medicine and starts running, avoiding gunshots whilst Bugs and Daffy, dressed as hunters, stalk him with guns in their hands.

Voice cast 
 Mel Blanc as Bugs Bunny, Daffy Duck, and Elephant
Arthur Q. Bryan as Elmer Fudd (uncredited)

Reception
Rabbit Fire is generally considered among Chuck Jones and Michael Maltese's best works, and is noted for its use of dialogue gags in lieu of the physical gags more typical in animation. Besides the two sequels to this film, a number of other Jones shorts, including Beanstalk Bunny and Ali Baba Bunny, paired quick-witted Bugs and self-serving Daffy with (or rather against) each other.

It is also worth noting that in this episode, Mel Blanc showcased his ability to make one character imitate another character's voice, in this case, Daffy Duck impersonating Bugs Bunny and vice versa. Actor and voice actor Hank Azaria pointed out that as a voice actor, it is almost impossible to accomplish. At one point, he tried to do that in The Simpsons, along with the other cast members, but none of them could do it.

The "rabbit season/duck season" argument from this short became one of the references in the Looney Tunes franchise to have been analyzed both by scholars and by Jones himself (although this gag was actually used by Daffy against Porky six years earlier in the cartoon Duck Soup to Nuts). According to an essay by Darragh O'Donoghue, Rabbit Fire "stands in close relation to human experience, striving and generally failing to grasp an elusive quarry or goal." Richard Thompson said that in the film, there is "the clearest definition of character roles: Elmer never knows what's going on; Bugs always knows what's going on and is in control of things; Daffy is bright enough to understand how to be in control, but never quite makes it." Jones himself refers to Rabbit Fire as a "corner" picture, among his works that, "as in turning a corner in a strange city, reveal new and enchanting vistas."

The short earned an honorable mention for animation historian Jerry Beck's list of The Fifty Greatest Cartoons: As Selected by 1000 Animation Professionals. Its 1952 sequel, Rabbit Seasoning, made the actual list at number 30. The style, setup, and plot of Rabbit Fire were adapted into the opening sequence of Warner Bros.' 2003 film Looney Tunes: Back in Action.

The non sequitur elephant character based on Joe Besser was the inspiration for Horatio the Elephant, a recurring character on PBS' Sesame Street.

The Elephant from The Major Lied 'Til Dawn reappeared, but was redesigned.

Production details
 In two interviews conducted years after this cartoon was first released, director Chuck Jones fondly recalled voice artist Mel Blanc improvising hilariously as Daffy when he was trying to think of another word besides "despicable". However, in the finished film, only the words from the original dialogue script actually appear. Historians believe that Blanc did indeed improvise, as Jones remembered, but then Jones had decided instead to use what was originally written.
 Rabbit Fire and its two sequels often have two characters in the same frame for some length of time — an atypical aspect of the "Hunting" trilogy. In order to keep budgets under control, most Warner Bros. cartoons would cut back and forth between characters, rather than put two or more in the same shot. Or, at least, both characters might be in the same shot, but only one would actually be animated.
 Although the film is introduced by the Looney Tunes music The Merry-Go-Round Broke Down, the opening card indicates a Merrie Melodies "Blue Ribbon" release from 1960, and the end card is Merrie Melodies, replacing the original orange-red Looney Tunes title sequences.
 It marked the first cartoon where Bugs and Daffy starred and appeared together. While Bugs had made a cameo in Porky Pig's Feat (which co-starred Daffy and Porky Pig), this was the first where both were the stars.
 Although this is the first cartoon with Daffy's selfish side replacing his screwball side, he still hollers "hoo-hoo", a catchphrase from his screwball personality.

Home media
This cartoon is available on the Looney Tunes Golden Collection: Volume 1, Disc 2, The Essential Bugs Bunny, Disc 1, and the Looney Tunes Platinum Collection: Volume 2, Disc 2.

References

Sources
 Jones, Chuck (1989). Chuck Amuck: The Life and Times of an Animated Cartoonist. New York: Farrar Straus & Giroux. .
 Jones, Chuck (1996). Chuck Reducks: Drawing from the Fun Side of Life. New York: Warner Books. .
 Thompson, Richard (January–February 1975). Film Comment.

External links

 
 

1951 films
1951 animated films
1951 short films
1950s Warner Bros. animated short films
1950s English-language films
Looney Tunes shorts
Short films directed by Chuck Jones
Films about hunters
Films scored by Carl Stalling
American animated short films
Animated films about rabbits and hares
Bugs Bunny films
Daffy Duck films
Elmer Fudd films
Fictional rivalries